The list of ship launches in 1987 includes a chronological list of all ships launched in 1987.


References

1987
Ship launches